The 2023 Colonial Athletic Association women's basketball tournament is the postseason women's college basketball tournament for the Colonial Athletic Association for the 2022–23 NCAA Division I women's basketball season. The tournament will be held March 8-12, 2023, at the SECU Arena in Towson, Maryland. The winner will receive the conference's automatic bid to the 2023 NCAA tournament.

Monmouth's victory in the tournament sent the Hawks to their first NCAA tournament since 1983.

Seeds

Schedule

Bracket

* denotes overtime game

References

External links

Colonial Athletic Association women's basketball tournament
Tournament
Towson, Maryland
College basketball tournaments in Maryland
CAA women's basketball tournament
CAA men's basketball tournament
Women's sports in Maryland